Per Jonas Edberg  (April 17, 1878 – August 6, 1957) was a Swedish politician. He was a member of the Centre Party and he served in the Parliament of Sweden (lower chamber) 1918–1930, 1929–1932 and from 1945.

Members of the Riksdag from the Centre Party (Sweden)
1878 births
1957 deaths
Members of the Andra kammaren